Sint-Lucas Hospital Heliport  is a hospital heliport located near Bruges, West Flanders, Belgium.

See also
 List of airports in Belgium

References

External links 
 Airport record for Sint-Lucas Hospital Heliport at Landings.com

Airports in West Flanders